Presidential elections were held in Northern Cyprus on 9 June 1985. Rauf Denktaş of the National Unity Party was re-elected with over 70% of the vote.

Results

References

Northern Cyprus
1985 in Northern Cyprus
Presidential elections in Northern Cyprus
June 1985 events in Europe